Vice Admiral Sir Peter Spencer KCB (born 1947) is a Royal Navy officer who became Second Sea Lord.

Naval career
Born in Brighton and educated at both Queens' College, Cambridge and Southampton University, Spencer was commissioned into the Royal Navy in 1965.

In 1992 he was appointed Director of Operational Requirements for the Royal Navy and in 1995 went on to be Director General Fleet Support for Operations and Plans. In 1997 he became Director General Surface Ships and Controller of the Navy.

In 2000 he became Second Sea Lord and Commander-in-Chief Naval Home Command and in 2003 he became Chief of Defence Procurement.

In retirement he became Chief Executive of Action for ME, a charity supporting people suffering from chronic fatigue syndrome.

Family
He is married to Lisa and they have four children.

References

|-

|-

1947 births
Military personnel from Sussex
Living people
Alumni of the University of Southampton
Knights Commander of the Order of the Bath
Royal Navy vice admirals
Alumni of Queens' College, Cambridge
People from Brighton